Edward, Ed, or Eddie White may refer to:

Arts and entertainment
Edward White (composer) (1910–1994), British composer
Edward Gates White (1918–1992), American musician
Edward J. White (1903–1973), American film producer
Edward Lucas White (1866–1934), American writer, fantasy
Eddie White (director) (born 1981), Australian actor and animation director

Politics
Edward White (Australian politician) (1869–1959), member of the Victorian Legislative Council
Edward Douglass White Sr. (1795–1847), Governor of Louisiana and U.S. Representative
Edward Douglass White (1845–1921), Chief Justice of the U.S. Supreme Court

Sports
Edward White (boxer) (1899–1984), British Olympic boxer
Edward White (cricketer) (1844–1922), English cricketer
Ed White (American football) (born 1947), American football offensive lineman, Vikings and Chargers
Ed White (Australian rules footballer) (1922–2012), Australian rules footballer
Ed White (baseball) (1926–1982), American Major League Baseball player
Ed White (golfer) (1913–1999), American amateur golfer and retired engineer
Ed White (wrestler) (1949–2005), Canadian wrestler, known as "Sailor" or "Moondog King"
Eddie White (baseball), Negro league baseball player
Eddie White (footballer) (born 1935), Scottish association football player
Eddie White (rugby league) (1883–1962), Australian rugby league footballer

Others
Edward White (Free-Church minister) (1819–1898), London Free Church minister
Edward White (Medal of Honor) (1877–1908), Philippine–American War soldier and Medal of Honor recipient
Edward White (printer) (c. 1548 – c. 1612), English printer
Edward Brickell White (1806–1882), American architect
Edward D. White Jr. (1925–2017), American architect
Edward John White (1831–1913), Anglo-Australian meteorologist and astronomer
Edward Higgins White Sr. (1901–1978), United States Air Force general
Ed White (astronaut) (1930–1967), American astronaut

See also
Ted White (disambiguation)
Edmund White (born 1940), American novelist
Edmund White (cricketer) (1928–2004), English cricketer